Michael John Raymond Rindel (born 9 February 1963) is a former international cricketer who played 22 One Day Internationals for South Africa from 1994 to 1999.

Domestic career
He played for several teams during his career, playing for Northerns and Easterns in South Africa, in addition to minor counties cricket for Buckinghamshire and Staffordshire. He was professional for Stockport CC in the Central Lancashire League in 1988.

International career
He made his ODI debut with a Man of the Match Performance with an all round performance of 32 runs and 2/15 against New Zealand during the Mandela Trophy in 1994–95.  His only century in ODIs was 106 against Pakistan at Wanderers Stadium, Johannesburg during the same tournament.  He was run out 5 times in his first 7 ODIs.

References

External links

1963 births
Living people
South African cricketers
South Africa One Day International cricketers
Buckinghamshire cricketers
Easterns cricketers
Northerns cricketers
Staffordshire cricketers
Cricketers at the 1998 Commonwealth Games
Commonwealth Games gold medallists for South Africa
Cricketers from Durban
Worcestershire Cricket Board cricketers
Commonwealth Games medallists in cricket
Medallists at the 1998 Commonwealth Games